Götzinger Achen is a river of Bavaria, Germany. It flows out of the Waginger See and discharges into the Salzach near Tittmoning.

See also
List of rivers of Bavaria

References

Rivers of Bavaria
Rivers of Germany